Southlake Town Square is a shopping precinct located in the city of Southlake, in the U.S. state of Texas. Owned and managed by Kite Realty Group.

History
The plans to develop open pastures into an upscale downtown for the City of Southlake began in the 1990s. Shortly after plans were approved by the city council, Cooper & Stebbins began developing phase I of the Southlake Town Square master plan. In 2006, Cooper & Stebbins opened phase II of Southlake Town Square.

In 2015, Granite Properties got the green light to build a seven-story office building east of North Carroll Boulevard. In 2020, Macy's chose Southlake Town Square to open its first Market by Macy’s.

Description 
Centered on Southlake's Town Hall, Southlake Town Square is incorporating Southlake Town Hall, Southlake Municipal Court, Southlake Public Library, Southlake DPS Headquarters, single-family residential, over 100 stores, 27 eateries, three parks, medical offices, Harkins Theater, and a Hilton luxury boutique hotel.

References

Shopping malls in the Dallas–Fort Worth metroplex
Shopping malls established in 1999
Buildings and structures in Denton County, Texas
Tourist attractions in Denton County, Texas
David M. Schwarz buildings
New Classical architecture
1999 establishments in Texas
Lifestyle centers (retail)